Joseph Cade (April 5, 1900 – death date unknown) was an American Negro league pitcher in the 1920s.

A native of St. Louis, Missouri, Cade played for the Bacharach Giants in 1929. In 11 recorded games on the mound, he posted a 6.56 ERA over 35.2 innings.

References

External links
 and Seamheads

1900 births
Year of death missing
Place of death missing
Bacharach Giants players
Baseball pitchers
Baseball players from St. Louis